Gratton is a census-designated place in Tazewell County, Virginia. The population as of the 2010 census was 937.

References

Census-designated places in Tazewell County, Virginia
Census-designated places in Virginia